Franco Ferreiro and Rubén Ramírez Hidalgo were the defending champions but decided not to participate.
Fabiano de Paula and Júlio Silva defeated Ariel Behar and Horacio Zeballos 6–1, 7–6(7–5) in the final.

Seeds

Draw

Draw

References
 Main Draw

Sao Leo Open - Doubles
2012 Doubles